Song Bo (Chinese: 宋博; born 26 December 1986 in Qingdao, Shandong) is a Chinese footballer who currently plays as left-footed midfielder or defender for Qingdao Youth Island.

Club career
Song Bo started his professional football career in 2005 when he was promoted to Qingdao Jonoon's first squad. In March 2007, Song transferred to China League One side Shanghai Stars.
In March 2010, Song returned to Qingdao Jonoon. On 4 April 2010, Song made his debut for Qingdao Jonoon in the 2010 Chinese Super League against Chongqing Lifan, coming on as a substitute for Jiang Ning in the 82nd minute.

In March 2016, Song was loaned to China League Two side Yinchuan Helanshan until 31 December 2016. In March 2019, Song returned to Qingdao Jonoon. After two seasons he would join neighbouring club Qingdao Youth Island and gain promotion with them in his first season.

Career statistics 
Statistics accurate as of match played 31 December 2021.

References

External links
SONG BO at Soccerway.com

1986 births
Living people
Association football defenders
Chinese footballers
Footballers from Shandong
Qingdao Hainiu F.C. (1990) players
Pudong Zobon players
Chinese Super League players
China League One players